Maura Tracy Healey (born February 8, 1971) is an American lawyer and politician serving as the 73rd governor of Massachusetts since 2023. A member of the Democratic Party, she served as Massachusetts Attorney General from 2015 to 2023, and was elected governor in 2022, defeating Republican nominee Geoff Diehl.

Hired by Massachusetts Attorney General Martha Coakley in 2007, Healey served as chief of the Civil Rights Division, where she spearheaded the state's challenge to the federal Defense of Marriage Act. She was then appointed chief of the Public Protection and Advocacy Bureau and then chief of the Business and Labor Bureau before resigning in 2013 to run for attorney general in 2014. She defeated former State Senator Warren Tolman in the Democratic primary and then defeated Republican attorney John Miller in the general election. Healey was reelected in 2018. She was elected governor of Massachusetts in 2022.

As an openly lesbian woman, Healey has made history several times through her electoral success. In 2014, she became the first openly lesbian woman elected attorney general of a U.S. state and the first openly LGBT person elected to statewide office in Massachusetts. In 2022, she became one of the first two openly lesbian women (alongside Tina Kotek) and the co-third openly LGBT person (alongside Tina Kotek and after Kate Brown and Jared Polis) elected governor of a U.S. state as well as the first woman elected governor of Massachusetts.

Early life and education
Born at the Bethesda Naval Hospital, Maura Tracy Healey grew up as the oldest of five brothers and sisters. When she was nine months old, her family moved to Hampton Falls, New Hampshire, where she was raised. Her mother was a nurse at Lincoln Akerman School in Hampton Falls; her father was a captain in the United States Public Health Service and an engineer. Her stepfather, Edward Beattie, taught history and coached girls' sports at Winnacunnet High School. Her family roots are in Newburyport and the North Shore area, while several of her grandparents and great-grandparents were born in Ireland.

Healey attended Winnacunnet High School, and majored in government at Harvard College, graduating cum laude in 1992. She was co-captain of the Harvard Crimson women's basketball team. After graduation, Healey spent two years playing as a starting point guard for a professional basketball team in Austria, UBBC Wustenrot Salzburg. Upon returning to the United States, she earned a Juris Doctor from Northeastern University School of Law in 1998.

Career
Healey began her legal career by clerking for Judge A. David Mazzone of the United States District Court for the District of Massachusetts, where she prepared monthly compliance reports on the cleanup of the Boston Harbor and assisted the judge with trials, hearings, and case conferences. Healey subsequently spent more than seven years at the law firm Wilmer Cutler Pickering Hale and Dorr LLP, where she worked as an associate and then junior partner and focused on commercial and securities litigation.

She also served as a special assistant district attorney in Middlesex County, where she tried drug, assault, domestic violence, and motor vehicle cases in bench and jury sessions and argued bail hearings, motions to suppress, and probation violations and surrenders.

Hired by Massachusetts Attorney General Martha Coakley in 2007, Healey served as chief of the Civil Rights Division, where she spearheaded the state's challenge to the federal Defense of Marriage Act. She led the winning arguments for Massachusetts in the country's first lawsuit striking down the law.

In 2012, Healey was promoted to chief of the Public Protection and Advocacy Bureau. She was then appointed chief of the Business and Labor Bureau.

As a division chief and bureau head in the Attorney General's Office, Healey oversaw 250 lawyers and staff members and supervised the areas of consumer protection, fair labor, ratepayer advocacy, environmental protection, health care, insurance and financial services, civil rights, antitrust, Medicaid fraud, nonprofit organizations and charities, and business, technology, and economic development.

During a Zoom conference call on June 3, 2020, before 300 members of the Greater Boston Chamber of Commerce, Healey asked for a call to action from business leaders to work to end racial inequalities and systemic racism. She ended her speech by saying, "Yes, America is burning, but that's how forests grow.”

Attorney General of Massachusetts (2015–2023)

Elections

2014

In October 2013, Healey announced her candidacy for attorney general. Coakley was retiring from the office to run for governor. On September 9, 2014, Healey won the Democratic primary by 126,420 votes, defeating former State Senator Warren Tolman, 62.4% to 37.6%.

Healey's campaign was endorsed by State Senators Stan Rosenberg, Dan Wolf, Jamie Eldridge and America's largest resource for pro-choice women in politics, EMILY's List. It was also endorsed by Northeast District Attorney David Sullivan, Holyoke Mayor Alex Morse, Fitchburg Mayor Lisa Wong, and Northampton Mayor David Narkewicz. Organizations that endorsed the campaign include the Planned Parenthood Advocacy Fund of Massachusetts, MassEquality, and the Victory Fund. Healey wrote an op-ed in the Worcester Telegram and Gazette on upholding the Massachusetts buffer zone law, which she worked on at the Attorney General's Office. She also authored an op-ed in The Boston Globe outlining her plan to combat student loan predators.

Healey defeated Republican nominee John Miller, an attorney, in the general election, 62.5% to 37.5%. Upon taking office, she became the United States' first openly lesbian state attorney general.

2018

On November 6, 2018, Healey was reelected Massachusetts Attorney General, defeating Republican nominee James McMahon with 69.9% of the vote.

Tenure
Healey's plan to reduce gun violence addresses what she perceives as its root causes. The plan includes enhancing the background check system to include information regarding recent restraining orders, pending indictments, any relations to domestic violence, parole, and probation information. The plan also seeks to better track stolen and missing guns. Healey advocates fingerprint trigger locks and firearm micro-stamping on all guns sold in Massachusetts.

Healey's plan for criminal justice reform includes ending mandatory sentences for nonviolent drug offenders and focusing on treatment rather than incarceration.

Healey plans to combat prescription drug abuse and Massachusetts's heroin epidemic by implementing a "lock-in" program. The program will be carried out in pharmacies as a way to identify and track prescription drug abusers and distributors. Her plan includes deployment of new resources to drug trafficking hotspots, improvement of treatment accessibility and expanding access to Narcan.

Abortion
Healey's women's rights platform focuses on sex education, expanding access to abortion services in Massachusetts, and ensuring that every woman in Massachusetts has access to abortion regardless of where she lives, her occupation, or her income.

Gun control
On July 20, 2016, Healey announced her intention to ban the manufacturing of most assault rifles in Massachusetts.

Trump administration 
On January 31, 2017, Healey announced that her office was joining a lawsuit challenging President Donald Trump's Executive Order 13769, commonly known as a "Muslim ban." Healey condemned the order as "motivated by anti-Muslim sentiment and Islamophobia, not by a desire to further national security." A federal court eventually struck the order down on similar grounds.

On March 9, 2017, Healey announced that her office was joining a lawsuit challenging Trump's Executive Order 13780. She said the new order, a revised version of the one that had been struck down, "remains a discriminatory and unconstitutional attempt to make good on [Trump's] campaign promise to implement a Muslim ban." The order has since been blocked in various federal courts on similar grounds.

On May 11, 2017, after Trump fired FBI Director James Comey, Healey led efforts calling for the appointment of a special counsel to investigate Russia's meddling in the 2016 U.S. presidential election. Her office sent a letter to that effect, signed by 20 Attorneys General across the nation, to Deputy U.S. Attorney General Rod Rosenstein. On May 17, Rosenstein appointed a special counsel, former FBI director Robert Mueller.

Purdue Pharma 

In 2021, Healey announced a resolution against the Sackler family and Purdue Pharma. The resolution requires a payment of more than $4.3 billion for prevention, treatment and recovery efforts in communities across the country. It will also require Purdue Pharma to be wound down or sold by 2024 and ensure that the Sacklers are banned from the opioid business and required to turn over control of family foundations to an independent trustee to be used to address the opioid epidemic.

Governor of Massachusetts 
At a news conference held at Bunker Hill Community College in March 2023, Healey announced a $20 million proposal to create a free community college program for Massachusetts residents age 25 or older with a secondary school degree or post-secondary course credits called "MassReconnect" to address the skills gap in the state workforce as an appropriation to her 2024 fiscal year state budget proposal.

Elections

2022 

[[File:2022_Massachusetts_gubernatorial_election_results_map_by_county.svg|thumb|150px|alt=Final results by county|Final results by county in 2022:

On January 20, 2022, Healey announced her candidacy in the 2022 Massachusetts gubernatorial election. Her announcement came after the incumbent Governor, Charlie Baker, a Republican, announced he would not seek reelection. On September 6, 2022, Healey won the Democratic primary election. She defeated Sonia Chang-Diaz, who withdrew from the primary. Healey received the endorsements of vice president Kamala Harris and senators Elizabeth Warren and Ed Markey.

On November 8, 2022, she defeated Geoff Diehl, the GOP candidate in the general election, which made her the nation's first openly lesbian governor. She was inaugurated on January 5, 2023.

Personal life 
In July 2022, Healey moved from Boston to Cambridge, Massachusetts. She plays basketball recreationally. On January 9, 2023, shortly after being inaugurated as governor, Healey announced that she is in a relationship with attorney Joanna Lydgate, her former chief deputy. She clarified that their relationship did not begin until Lydgate had departed the role to co-found the States United Democracy Center, a voting rights advocacy organization.

Electoral history

Attorney General of Massachusetts

Governor of Massachusetts

See also 
 List of female state attorneys general in the United States
 List of first openly LGBT politicians in the United States

Notes

References

External links 

 Governor Maura Healey and Lt. Governor Kim Driscoll official government website
 Maura Healey for Governor campaign website
 
 

|-

|-

|-

 
|-

|-

|-

 

1971 births
20th-century American lawyers
20th-century American women lawyers
21st-century American lawyers
21st-century American politicians
21st-century American women lawyers
21st-century American women politicians
American expatriate basketball people in Austria
American LGBT sportspeople
American women's basketball players
Basketball players from Massachusetts
Basketball players from New Hampshire
Catholics from Massachusetts
Catholics from New Hampshire
Democratic Party governors of Massachusetts
Harvard College alumni
Harvard Crimson women's basketball players
Lesbian politicians
Lesbian sportswomen
LGBT basketball players
LGBT law enforcement workers
LGBT lawyers
LGBT people from Massachusetts
LGBT people from New Hampshire
LGBT state governors of the United States
Living people
Massachusetts Attorneys General
Massachusetts lawyers
Northeastern University School of Law alumni
People from Charlestown, Boston
People from Hampton Falls, New Hampshire
Point guards
Wilmer Cutler Pickering Hale and Dorr partners
Women in Massachusetts politics
Women state governors of the United States